No Gold for a Dead Diver is a 1974 West German adventure film directed by Harald Reinl and starring Horst Janson, Monika Lundi and Marius Weyers. A thriller about deep sea divers searching for buried treasure, it was shot on location in South Africa. The film's sets were designed by the art director Dieter Bartels.

After the success of Jaws (1975), the film was released in the US with the title Deadly Jaws.

Cast

Home video
In October 2017, RetroVision Entertainment released the film on DVD, paired with Night of the Sharks.

References

Bibliography

External links 
 

1974 films
1970s adventure films
German adventure films
West German films
1970s German-language films
Films directed by Harald Reinl
Terra Film films
Constantin Film films
Treasure hunt films
Underwater action films
Films based on German novels
Films shot in South Africa
1970s German films